The Putty Road is a rural road that links the northwestern suburbs of Sydney to the Hunter Region in New South Wales, in eastern Australia.

Route and features
The  Putty Road is very historic, closely following the Bulga Road (named after the Bulga Creek), first explored by John Howe, Chief Constable of Windsor, being the first road to link Sydney to the Hunter Valley. It was opened in 1823 and was initially a popular cattle-duffing (an Australian term for cattle-rustling) route.

The Putty Road is bounded to the west and east by protected national parksthe Wollemi National Park to the west, and the Yengo National Park to the eastboth part of the UNESCO World Heritagelisted Greater Blue Mountains Area. The road is narrow and winding in places and very scenic. It may be hazardous during wet weather. The Putty Road enters the Hunter Valley at the northern end of the Howes Creek gorge. The road is popular with tourists, motorcyclists and cyclists.

The Golden Highway and the Putty Road share approximately  near Singleton, where the two roads merge as their eastern terminus adjoins the New England Highway, bypassing Singleton.

Putty Road was formerly part of State Route 69, a route which once traversed from Wollongong through Campbelltown, Penrith, Windsor and then along Putty Road to Singleton. However, now the route south of Windsor has been signed A9 to Campbelltown and B69 to Wollongong, leaving Putty Road unnumbered.

Major intersections

See also

 Highways in Australia
 List of highways in New South Wales

References 

Highways in New South Wales
Roads in the Hunter Region